Hank Leigh McDowell (born November 13, 1959) is an American former professional basketball player. Born in Memphis, Tennessee, he was a 6'9" (205 cm) 210 lb (95 kg) forward and he played collegiately at Memphis State University (now called the University of Memphis). He played in the National Basketball Association (NBA) from 1981 to 1987. He was originally selected as the tenth pick in the 5th round of the 1981 NBA draft by the Golden State Warriors. During his six-year NBA career he played with the Golden State Warriors, Portland Trail Blazers, San Diego Clippers, Houston Rockets and Milwaukee Bucks.

After his playing career, he launched McDowell Marketing, a Memphis-based business specializing in corporate apparel and promotional products. He has also worked as an analyst on both radio and television broadcasts for the University of Memphis.

McDowell and fellow former NBA player and Memphis State alum Elliot Perry, were announced as the Memphis Grizzlies' radio broadcast team's color commentators during the 2006–07 NBA season.

Career statistics

NBA

Regular season

|-
| align="left" | 1981–82
| align="left" | Golden State
| 30 || 1 || 11.2 || .405 || .000 || .659 || 3.3 || 0.7 || 0.2 || 0.3 || 3.2
|-
| align="left" | 1982–83
| align="left" | Golden State
| 14 || 0 || 9.3 || .448 || .000 || .778 || 2.1 || 0.3 || 0.1 || 0.3 || 2.9
|-
| align="left" | 1982–83
| align="left" | Portland
| 42 || 0 || 8.9 || .464 || .000 || .767 || 2.1 || 0.5 || 0.1 || 0.2 || 2.9
|-
| align="left" | 1983–84
| align="left" | San Diego
| 57 || 0 || 10.7 || .431 || .000 || .679 || 2.7 || 0.6 || 0.2 || 0.0 || 3.6
|-
| align="left" | 1984–85
| align="left" | Houston
| 34 || 0 || 3.9 || .476 || .000 || .700 || 0.6 || 0.3 || 0.1 || 0.1 || 1.4
|-
| align="left" | 1985–86
| align="left" | Houston
| 22 || 0 || 9.3 || .571 || .000 || .680 || 2.2 || 0.3 || 0.0 || 0.1 || 3.0
|-
| align="left" | 1986–87
| align="left" | Milwaukee
| 7 || 0 || 10.0 || .471 || .000 || .857 || 2.7 || 0.3 || 0.3 || 0.0 || 3.1
|- class="sortbottom"
| style="text-align:center;" colspan="2"| Career
| 206 || 1 || 9.0 || .451 || .000 || .710 || 2.3 || 0.5 || 0.2 || 0.1 || 2.9
|}

Playoffs

|-
| align="left" | 1982–83
| align="left" | Portland
| 2 || - || 2.0 || .000 || .000 || .000 || 1.0 || 1.0 || 0.0 || 0.0 || 0.0
|-
| align="left" | 1985–86
| align="left" | Houston
| 13 || 0 || 2.5 || .286 || .000 || .625 || 0.6 || 0.2 || 0.0 || 0.0 || 0.7
|- class="sortbottom"
| style="text-align:center;" colspan="2"| Career
| 15 || 0 || 2.5 || .250 || .000 || .625 || 0.7 || 0.3 || 0.0 || 0.0 || 0.6
|}

College

|-
| align="left" | 1977–78
| align="left" | Memphis
| 14 || - || 6.3 || .643 || - || .727 || 1.1 || - || - || - || 1.9
|-
| align="left" | 1978–79
| align="left" | Memphis
| 28 || - || 22.8 || .468 || - || .693 || 5.2 || - || - || - || 7.6
|-
| align="left" | 1979–80
| align="left" | Memphis
| 27 || - || 33.3 || .451 || - || .570 || 7.5 || - || - || - || 10.0
|-
| align="left" | 1980–81
| align="left" | Memphis
| 27 || - || 34.6 || .496 || - || .721 || 7.6 || - || - || - || 11.9
|- class="sortbottom"
| style="text-align:center;" colspan="2"| Career
| 96 || - || 26.7 || .475 || - || .668 || 5.9 || - || - || - || 8.7
|}

References

External links
 Hank McDowell NBA stats @ basketballreference.com

1959 births
Living people
American broadcasters
American expatriate basketball people in Italy
American expatriate basketball people in Spain
American men's basketball players
Basketball players from Memphis, Tennessee
CB Girona players
Cincinnati Slammers players
Golden State Warriors draft picks
Golden State Warriors players
Houston Rockets players
Liga ACB players
Memphis Grizzlies announcers
Memphis Tigers men's basketball players
Milwaukee Bucks players
Portland Trail Blazers players
San Diego Clippers players
Small forwards
United States Basketball League players